This article shows all participating team squads at the 2001 Men's European Volleyball Championship, held in Ostrava, Czech Republic from September 8 to September 16, 2001.

Head Coach: —

Head Coach: —

Head Coach: Philippe Blain

Head Coach: —

Head Coach: —

Head Coach: —

Head Coach: Bert Goedkoop

The following is the Polish roster in the 2001 Men's European Volleyball Championship.

Head Coach: —

Head Coach: —

Head Coach: —

Head Coach: Zoran Gajić

References
CEV

S
E
2001 in volleyball